Wolfgang Henner Peter Lebrecht Graf von Blücher (31 January 1917 – 21 May 1941) was a highly decorated Oberleutnant of the Reserves in the Fallschirmjäger during World War II.  He was also a recipient of the Knight's Cross of the Iron Cross.  The Knight's Cross of the Iron Cross was awarded to recognise extreme battlefield bravery or successful military leadership.  Wolfgang Graf von Blücher was one of three brothers who were killed during the Battle of Crete, all three of them on 21 May 1941.

Awards and decorations
Fallschirmschützenabzeichen
 Iron Cross (1939)
 2nd Class (18 April 1940)
 1st Class (24 May 1940)
 Knight's Cross of the Iron Cross on 24 May 1940 as Leutnant of the Reserves and Zugführer (platoon leader) in the 2./Fallschirmjäger-Regiment 1

Footnotes

References

Citations

Bibliography

 Beevor, Antony (2005). Crete: The Battle and the Resistance. London, England: John Murray (Publishers). ISBN 978-0-7195-6831-2
 
 
 
 

1917 births
1941 deaths
People from Unstrut-Hainich-Kreis
Luftwaffe personnel killed in World War II
People from the Province of Saxony
Fallschirmjäger of World War II
Counts of Germany
Recipients of the Knight's Cross of the Iron Cross
Military personnel from Thuringia